Robinsonia formula is a moth in the family Erebidae. It was described by Augustus Radcliffe Grote in 1866. It is found on Cuba and the Dominican Republic.

References

Moths described in 1866
Robinsonia (moth)
Arctiinae of South America